Valentin Nüssbaumer (born 25 September 2000) is a Swiss professional ice hockey left winger who is currently playing with HC Davos of the National League (NL). Nüssbaumer was drafted 207th overall by the Arizona Coyotes in the 2019 NHL Entry Draft.

Playing career
Nüssbaumer made his professional debut with EHC Biel in the 2017–18 season, appearing in 26 National League games this season. He spent the rest of the season with Biel's junior team in the Elite Junior A, where he played 20 games and put up 18 points (7 goals) and added 6 points (3 goals) in 8 games in the playoffs. Nüssbaumer spent the 2018–19 season with the Shawinigan Cataractes in the QMJHL. He played an additional 31 games with the team during the 2019–20 season before returning to EHC Biel for the end of the season.

On January 11, 2021, Nüssbaumer was traded, along with David Ullström, to HC Davos in exchange for Luca Hischier and Perttu Lindgren.

International play
Nüssbaumer was named to Switzerland's national junior team for the 2018, 2019 and 2020 World Junior Championship.

References

External links

2000 births
Living people
EHC Biel players
Shawinigan Cataractes players
HC Davos players
Arizona Coyotes draft picks
Swiss ice hockey left wingers
People from Delémont
Sportspeople from the canton of Jura